Mikhail Aleksandrovich Kostyukov (born 9 August 1991) is a Russian football player who plays for FC Rubin Kazan. He is versatile and has been deployed in a variety of positions on the field, most often as a right midfielder, winger or centre-forward.

Club career
He made his debut in the Russian Second Division for FC Khimik Dzerzhinsk on 24 April 2011 in a game against FC Gornyak Uchaly.

He made his Russian Premier League debut for FC Amkar Perm on 15 August 2016 in a game against FC Orenburg.

On 29 May 2019, he signed with FC Tambov for a term of one year with one year extension option.

On 1 February 2021, he signed a 4-year contract with FC Rubin Kazan.

Career statistics

Club

Notes

References

1991 births
Sportspeople from Nizhny Novgorod
Living people
Russian footballers
Association football midfielders
FC Khimik Dzerzhinsk players
FC Volga Nizhny Novgorod players
FC Amkar Perm players
FC Yenisey Krasnoyarsk players
FC Tambov players
FC Rubin Kazan players
Russian Premier League players
Russian First League players
Russian Second League players